Jorge Cruise (born March 6, 1971 in Mexico City) is a Mexican author, fitness trainer and proponent of intermittent fasting and low-carbohydrate dieting. He is the author of The Cruise Control Diet (2019) as well as books on The New York Times bestseller list: The 100 (2013), The Belly Fat Cure (2010), Body at Home (2009), The 12-Second Sequence (2009), The 3-Hour Diet (2006), and 8 Minutes in the Morning (2002).

Career 

Cruise began his career working for Tony Robbins and was inspired by Robbins to launch his career as a trainer. Several years later, he got his big break when Oprah Winfrey both hired him as her personal trainer and featured him on her televised show and in her magazine. Cruise has created a number of different diet plans over the last decade, his philosophy evolving over the years from heavy emphasis on increasing metabolism through building lean muscle (8 Minutes in the Morning, The 12-Second Sequence) to advocating smaller-yet-more-frequent meals (The 3-Hour Diet, Body at Home) to recommending low-carb/low-sugar meal plans (The Belly Fat Cure). His most recent work, The Cruise Control Diet, advocates a "better than keto" intermittent fasting technique in conjunction with a keto diet.

Cruise's The 3-Hour Diet has been labelled a fad diet. It was criticized by Rebecca Foster of the British Nutrition Foundation who noted that eating meals every three hours would increase over-eating and cause negative effects on dental health. Cruise has authored The 100 diet in 2013, which restricts the consumption of sugar calories to 100 per day for quick weight loss. It has also been criticized as a fad diet. Dietician Laura Jeffers commented that "this is basically a super low-carb diet. You may very well lose that weight, but it will be difficult to keep the weight off long-term. If a diet is filled with unsustainable restrictions, weight that comes off fast will be fast coming back on."

Filmography

Television

References

External links
 Official website
 

1971 births
Dartmouth College alumni
Fasting advocates
Living people
Low-carbohydrate cookbook writers
Low-carbohydrate diet advocates
Mexican male writers
Pseudoscientific diet advocates
University of California, San Diego alumni
Writers from Mexico City